In the mathematical theory of probability, David Lewis's triviality result is a theorem about the impossibility of systematically equating the conditional probability  with the probability of a so-called conditional event, .

Conditional probability and conditional events

The statement "The probability that if , then , is 20%" means (put intuitively) that event  may be expected to occur in 20% of the outcomes where event  occurs.

Beginning in the 1960s, several philosophical logicians—most notably  Ernest Adams and Robert Stalnaker—floated the idea that one might also write , where  is the conditional event "If , then ".

Part of the appeal of this move would be the possibility of embedding conditional expressions within more complex constructions. One could write, say, to express someone's high subjective degree of confidence ("75% sure") that either , or else if , then . Compound constructions containing conditional expressions might also be useful in the programming of automated decision-making systems.

How might such a convention be combined with standard probability theory? The most direct extension of the standard theory would be to treat  as an event like any other, i.e., as a set of outcomes.

For  to equal  requires that , i.e., that the probability inside the  region equal the  region's proportional share of the probability inside the  region. In general the equality will of course not be true, so that making it reliably true requires a new constraint on probability functions: in addition to satisfying Kolmogorov's probability axioms, they must also satisfy a new constraint, namely that  for any events  and  such that .

Lewis's result

 pointed out a seemingly fatal problem with the above proposal: assuming a nontrivial set of events, the new, restricted class of -functions will not be closed under conditioning, the operation that turns probability function  into new function , predicated on event 's occurrence. This implies that if rationality requires having a well-behaved probability function, then a fully rational person (or computing system) would become irrational simply in virtue of learning that arbitrary event  had occurred. Bas van Fraassen called this result "a veritable bombshell" (1976, p. 273).

Lewis's proof is as follows. The existence of two such events implies the existence of the event , as well, and, if conditional events are admitted, the event . The proof derives a contradiction from the assumption that such a minimally non-trivial set of events exists.
 Conditioning on  gives . But also, by the new constraint on -functions,  . Therefore, .
 Conditioning on  gives . But also,  . Therefore, .
Therefore, which means that , which contradicts the stipulation that . This completes the proof.

Graphical version

By the assumption that together  and  do not together exhaust all possibilities, . And by the new constraint on probability functions, which means that
(1) 

Conditioning on an event involves zeroing out the probabilities outside the event's region and increasing the probabilities inside the region by a common scale factor.
(2)  which simplifies to 

(3)  which simplifies to 

Similarly, from (3), .

Later developments

Separately,  pointed out that even without conditioning, if the number of outcomes is large but finite, then in general , being a ratio of two outputs of the -function, will take on more values than any single output of the function can. So, for instance, if in Fig. 1  are all multiples of 0.01 (as would be the case if there were exactly 100 equiprobable outcomes), then  must be a multiple of 0.01, as well, but  need not be. That being the case,  cannot reliably be made to equal .

 also argued that the condition  caused acceptable -functions to be implausibly sparse and isolated from one another. One way to put the point: standardly, any weighted average of two probability function is itself a probability function, so that between any two -functions there will be a continuum of weighted-average -functions along which one of the original -functions gradually transforms into the other. But these continua disappear if the added  condition is imposed. Now an average of two acceptable -functions will in general not be an acceptable -function.

Possible rejoinders

Assuming that  holds for a minimally nontrivial set of events and for any -function leads to a contradiction. Thus  can hold for any -function only for trivial sets of events—that is the triviality result. However, the proof relies on background assumptions that may be challenged.

But the most common response, among proponents of the  condition, has been to explore ways to model conditional events as something other than subsets of a universe set of outcomes. Even before Lewis published his result,  had modeled conditional events as ordered pairs of sets of outcomes. With that approach and others in the same spirit, conditional events and their associated combination and complementation operations do not constitute the usual algebra of sets of standard probability theory, but rather a more exotic type of structure, known as a conditional event algebra.

Notes

References

 
 
 
 
 
 
 

Probability articles needing expert attention
Logic
Conditional probability